Renzo Junior Guevara Avalos (born 2 September 1983) is a Peruvian footballer who plays as a full back. He currently plays for Universidad Técnica de Cajamarca.

Club career
Guevara made his debut in the Torneo Descentralizado in the 2003 season with Sport Boys. He stayed with the Callao-based club until the 2004 season.

In January 2005 he joined Unión Huaral as a free player. There he played under manager Roberto Arrelucea. He helped the club avoid relegation by finishing in 11th place in the Relegation table at the end of the 2005 Descentralizado season. In his second season with the Huaral club, Guevara scored his first Descentralizado league goal in Round 1 (Apertura) away to José Gálvez FBC. His goal was scored in the 6th minute and was the winning goal in 0–3 victory for his side. However, Unión Huaral finished in last place and were relegated at the end of the 2006 Descentralizado season.

Instead of going to play in the Second Division with Union Huaral, Guevara joined Total Clean as a free player in January 2007. He made his Descentralizado debut for his new side in Round 1 at home in the 1–2 loss against Universitario de Deportes. Guevara scored the winning goal in his club's first win of the season in Round 5 in the 3–0 home win over Coronel Bolognesi FC. He made a total of 19 league appearances with Total Clean but could not help the club avoid relegation at the end of the 2007 Descentralizado season.

In January 2008 Guevara signed as a free player for José Gálvez FBC.

Honours

Club
José Gálvez
Torneo Intermedio: 2011
Segunda División: 2011

References

External links

1983 births
Living people
Footballers from Lima
Peruvian footballers
Sport Boys footballers
Unión Huaral footballers
Total Chalaco footballers
José Gálvez FBC footballers
Universidad Técnica de Cajamarca footballers
Peruvian Primera División players
Peruvian Segunda División players
Copa Perú players
Association football fullbacks